Stigmella georgiana is a moth of the family Nepticulidae. It was described by Sco Puplesis in 1994. It is found in Georgia.

References

Nepticulidae
Moths of Asia
Moths described in 1994
Invertebrates of Georgia (country)